The East Coast Conference men's basketball tournament was the conference championship tournament in men's basketball for the East Coast Conference. The tournament was held annually between 1975 and 1994, after which the conference disbanded.

Tournament champions by year

No tournament was played in 1993.

Finals appearances by school

References